Jovan Ali (born 3 May 1995) is a Trinidadian cricketer who has played for the Combined Campuses and Colleges in West Indian domestic cricket. A slow left-arm orthodox bowler, Ali made his List A debut for the team in January 2016, playing against the Leeward Islands in the 2015–16 Regional Super50.

References

External links
Player profile and statistics at CricketArchive
Player profile and statistics at ESPNcricinfo

1995 births
Living people
Combined Campuses and Colleges cricketers
Trinidad and Tobago cricketers